Syuejia District, alternatively spelled Xuejia, is a district of about 24,857 residents in Tainan City, Taiwan.

Name

History
After the handover of Taiwan from Japan to the Republic of China in 1945, Syuejia was organized as a rural township of Tainan County. On 2 February 1968, Syuejia was upgraded from rural township to urban township due to its population. On 25 December 2010, Tainan County was merged with Tainan City and Syuejia was upgraded to a district of the city.

Administrative divisions 
Xiuchang, Mingyi, Cifu, Rende, Xinda, Xinrong, Dawan, Fenghe, Zhongzhou, Guanghua, Zhaigang, Pinghe and Sanqing Village.

Tourist attractions 

 Agricultural Fishery Resort
 Ciji Temple
 Leopard King Safari Zoo
 Wanpi World Safari Zoo

Notable natives 
 Kao Ching-yuen, founder of Uni-President Enterprises Corporation

References

External links 

 

Districts of Tainan
Taiwan placenames originating from Formosan languages